The Ohio Central Railroad  is a part of the Ohio Central Railroad System, operating a former Wheeling & Lake Erie Railway line between Warwick and Zanesville, Ohio, United States. Operations began in 1988. It has several connections with tracks on which CSX has trackage rights.

The company was acquired by Genesee & Wyoming in 2008 as part of its purchase of the Ohio Central Railroad System.

Gallery

References

External links

Ohio railroads
Genesee & Wyoming
Spin-offs of the Norfolk Southern Railway
1988 establishments in Ohio